Northfields is a London Underground station in Northfields, in the London Borough of Ealing. The station is on the Heathrow branch of the Piccadilly line, between Boston Manor and South Ealing stations. It is located on Northfield Avenue (B452) and in Travelcard Zone 3.

History
The route through Northfields station was opened by the District Railway (DR, now the District line), on 1 May 1883 on a line to Hounslow Town (located on Hounslow High Street but now closed). The station opened as Northfield (Ealing) on 16 April 1908. The station was renamed Northfields and Little Ealing on 11 December 1911.

The station was rebuilt twice. As a halt, the 1908 station was quite basic and provided only rudimentary shelters for passengers. The first rebuilding took place in the 1910s (possibly in conjunction with the 1911 renaming) and the station was given a proper booking hall on the bridge over the tracks and better platform canopies.

In the early 1930s, a new Northfields station was built in conjunction with the preparations for the introduction of Piccadilly line services on the Hounslow branch and the new Northfields depot that would house its trains. Located on the east side of Northfields Avenue, the new station was designed by Charles Holden in a modern European style using brick, reinforced concrete and glass. Like the stations at Sudbury Town, Sudbury Hill, Acton Town and Oakwood that Holden also designed, Northfields station features a tall block-like ticket hall rising above a low horizontal structure that contains station offices and shops. The brick walls of the ticket hall are punctuated with panels of clerestory windows and the structure is capped with a flat concrete slab roof.

The new station opened on 19 May 1932 with the current name. It has two island platforms serving four sets of tracks (two eastbound and two westbound) and is connected directly to the Northfields depot immediately to the west of the station and south of the tracks. Trains may terminate at Northfields station and then run on to the west to enter the depot. To avoid operational conflicts between the eastbound depot exit track and the westbound running track to Boston Manor, the westbound running track passes under the depot track in a cutting. Trains normally enter and exit service at Northfields although there is also a single track connection from the depot to the westbound running track west of Boston Manor.

Piccadilly line services started running to Northfields from Acton Town on 1 January 1933 and were extended to run to Hounslow West on 13 March 1933. From this date, the branch was operated jointly by both lines until District line services were withdrawn west of Northfields on 9 October 1964 and between Acton Town and Northfields on 10 October 1964.

On 17 May 1994, Northfields station was made a Grade II listed building.

Connections
London Buses routes E2 and E3 and night route N11 serve the station.

References

External links

 
 
 
 
 
 
  The large building on the right is the London Underground's Northfields substation.
  This photograph was taken from a bridge leading to a now demolished exit in Weymouth Avenue. The foundations of the path to this exit remain on the northern embankment.

Piccadilly line stations
London Underground Night Tube stations
Tube stations in the London Borough of Ealing
Former Metropolitan District Railway stations
London Underground depots
Railway stations in Great Britain opened in 1908
Charles Holden railway stations
Grade II listed buildings in the London Borough of Ealing
Grade II listed railway stations
1908 establishments in England